Oued Ouea (alternative names: Ouêa, Wêa) is a town in the Tadjourah region of Djibouti.

References

External links 
Oued Ouea, Djibouti

Populated places in Djibouti